Computer-assisted gaming (CAG) and computer-assisted wargaming (CAWG) refer to games which are at least partially computerized, but where on important part of the action is not virtual but performed in real life or on a miniature terrain. Regulation of the game can be done completely by a computer or partly deferred to a human referee. Computer-assisted gaming attempts to combine the advantages of PC games with those of face-to-face games. In computer-assisted gaming, computers are used for recordkeeping and sometimes for the resolution of combat, but a Human referee makes any decisions requiring judgement.

Variations 
A computer-assisted game can be little more than a collection of rules and notes on computer, or as complete as a computer game, with a human referee needed only to make the non-random decisions.  It can be played remotely or with everyone in the same room looking at one or more computer monitors.  (The referee must have his own monitor; the players can share one, or each player can have his own.  Or only the referee may have a monitor, with the players using paper as usual.)  This flexibility allows players to combine the best aspects of paper-and-pencil and computer games while computerizing the game as much or as little as desired.
 
Computer-assisted games are mostly not designed toward recreating the battlefield inside computer memory, but employing the computer to play the role of game master by storing game rules and unit (wargames) or role (role playing games) characteristics, tracking unit or character status and positions or distances, animating the game with sounds and voice and resolving combat (shooting and close combat). All distance relationships are tracked on the tabletop. All record-keeping is tracked by the computer.

Role-playing games
Role-playing games were one of the first types of games for which computer-assisted gaming programs were developed. Computer-aided role-playing game programs are designed to help game masters and players alike.  Those programs range from acting as convenient format for a character sheet; or other game materials; all the way up to full automation of the game mechanics of a role-playing game system . This is especially useful for character creation/maintenance and rules resolutions for complex simulationist games.

Poker

There are multiple poker tools that allow players to do statistical analysis of games. An example is a poker calculator, which determines the player's probability of winning, losing, or tying a hand.

Tabletop projection
Another example of computer-assisted gaming growing in popularity among role-playing game players is the use of a digital projector or flat screen monitors to present maps or other visual elements during game play. These elements may be used on their own, or in concert with miniatures to map out combats, and exploration or to introduce other visual media into the game without resorting to printing or drawing these items.;

Webcam data acquisition
 Webcam enabled computer-assisted wargames use computer vision to process firing with images of the camera. In the case of an external USB camera, it is placed behind the firing unit selected (third person shooter) in the direction of the target. When a tablet is used the rear webcam is selected. Precise positioning of the webcam behind the shooting unit is not required : it is sufficient both the shooting unit and the target unit are displayed on the captured image for the shot to be valid. This makes the usage of a tablet very practical for these games. Target detection algorithms (improved magic wand contour, polygon simplification, convex hull algorithms, polygon degree of convexity) allow to analyze the characteristics of the target and to estimate the distance to the target. Damage is computed by taking into the account distance (in distance units) between the firing unit and the target, the type of gun (anti-tank value) of the firing unit and the thickness of the armor of the target (defend value).

References

External links 
 Mac-Assisted Role-Playing, insidemacgames.com on CARP
 Pen, Paper, and Pixel Computer-assisted gaming site of Ennie award winner Jans Carton.

 
Role-playing game terminology